Nikollë Lesi is the owner and editor of the newspaper Koha Jonë and a former Member of the Albanian Parliament.

Koha Jonë was Albania's first private newspaper, and was formed by Nikollë Lesi.

References

External links 
https://web.archive.org/web/20180907032234/http://nikollelesi.com/

Albanian Christians
Living people
People from Lezhë
Demochristian Party of Albania politicians
Political party leaders of Albania
Year of birth missing (living people)